USS C-1 (SS-9) was the lead ship of her class of submarines built for the United States Navy in the first decade of the 20th century.

Description
The C-class submarines were enlarged versions of the preceding B class, the first American submarines with two propeller shafts. They displaced  on the surface and  submerged. The C-class boats had a crew of 1 officer and 14 enlisted men.

For surface running, they were powered by two  Craig gasoline engines, each driving one propeller shaft. When submerged each propeller was driven by a  electric motor. They could reach  on the surface and  underwater.

The boats were armed with two 18-inch (450 mm) torpedo tubes in the bow. They carried two reloads, for a total of four torpedoes.

Construction and career
C-1 was laid down by Fore River Shipbuilding Company in Quincy, Massachusetts, under a subcontract from Electric Boat Company, as Octopus. Octopus was launched on 4 October 1906 sponsored by Miss F. Webster, and commissioned on 30 June 1908. She was renamed C-1 on 17 November 1911. Assigned to Submarine Flotilla 2 (SubFlot 2), Octopus operated out of Newport, Rhode Island and New York City until 9 October 1908. Tests and experiments, of both submarine design and the tactical use of her type, continued from Norfolk, Virginia and Newport until she was placed in reserve at Charleston, South Carolina on 14 February 1910. Recommissioned on 15 April, the submarine conducted experiments and served as training vessel at Newport until 10 May 1913. C-1 was reassigned to Submarine Group 1, Torpedo Flotilla, Atlantic Fleet, and from 29 May – 7 December operated out of Guantánamo Bay, Cuba. She served in Panamanian waters in training, and later, on patrol during World War I until 4 August 1919, when she was decommissioned at Coco Solo in the Panama Canal Zone. Here, she was sold on 13 April 1920.

Notes

References

External links

United States C-class submarines
World War I submarines of the United States
Ships built in Quincy, Massachusetts
1906 ships